She Painted Her Face is a 1937 novel by the English author Dornford Yates (Cecil William Mercer). It was first serialised in Woman's Journal (December 1936 to April 1937, illustrated by Forster) and in Woman's Home Companion (December 1936 to May 1937, under the title Counterfeit Coin, illustrated by Frederick Chapman).

Plot 
Richard Exon (narrator) defends the life and birthright of Lady Elizabeth Virgil. A castle in Carinthia, and its well, forms the backdrop.

Background 
Mercer’s autobiographer AJ Smithers noted that it cannot be by accident that one of the characters bears the name of Mercer's much loved grandmother, Harriet, and that the heroine is called Elizabeth, the name of his second wife.

Critical reception 
Smithers considered this book to be a pot-boiler, although "it is necessary to admit that the yarn is an excellent one, tautly written and as exciting as ever ... Few writers possessed such a gift for turning old material into acceptable wear”.

References

Bibliography
 

1937 British novels
British thriller novels
Ward, Lock & Co. books
Novels by Dornford Yates
Works originally published in Woman's Home Companion